This is a list of singles that have peaked in the Top 10 of the Billboard Hot 100 during 1991.

Mariah Carey scored four top ten hits during the year with "Someday", "I Don't Wanna Cry", "Emotions", and "Can't Let Go", the most among all other artists.

Top-ten singles

1990 peaks

1992 peaks

See also
 1991 in music
 List of Hot 100 number-one singles of 1991 (U.S.)
 Billboard Year-End Hot 100 singles of 1991

References

General sources

Joel Whitburn Presents the Billboard Hot 100 Charts: The Nineties
Additional information obtained can be verified within Billboard's online archive services and print editions of the magazine.

1991
United States Hot 100 Top 10